Tangshan South railway station is a railway station in Lunan District, Tangshan, Hebei, China. It is an intermediate stop on the Qidaoqiao–Luanxian railway.

History 
The station opened in 1882 as Tangshan railway station. In the 1990s it was renamed Tangshan South following the opening of the new Tangshan railway station to passenger services in 1994. On 26 June 1996 the station closed to passenger services.

On 18 January 2018, a passenger service was reinstated at the station.

See also 

 Tangshan railway station
 Tangshan West railway station

References 

Railway stations in Hebei
Railway stations in China opened in 1882